"Saints and Sinners" is a song by American rock band Godsmack. It is the third single from the band's fifth studio album, The Oracle.

Release 
On April 27, 2010, "Saints and Sinners" was released as the fourth song from The Oracle, giving the fans the opportunity to download it through iTunes. The song was later released as a single to active rock radio stations in March 2011.

Track listing 
Digital single

Commercial performance 
Upon its release as a single on late March, "Saints and Sinners" entered both Billboard Hot Mainstream Rock Tracks and the Billboard Rock Songs, peaking at number twenty-five and thirty-five, respectively.

Chart positions

Personnel 
 Sully Erna – Vocals, Rhythm guitar, Producer
 Tony Rombola – Lead guitar
 Robbie Merrill – Bass
 Shannon Larkin – Drums
 Dave Fortman – Producer

References 

2011 singles
Godsmack songs
2010 songs
Songs written by Sully Erna
Universal Republic Records singles